Hoče may refer to:

 Hoče, a former village and municipality 
 Municipality of Hoče-Slivnica, a municipality in Slovenia
 Spodnje Hoče, a settlement in the Municipality of Hoče–Slivnica
 Zgornje Hoče, a settlement in the Municipality of Hoče–Slivnica

sl:Hoče